Ligyrocoris sylvestris is a species of dirt-colored seed bug in the family Rhyparochromidae. It is found in Africa, Europe and Northern Asia (excluding China), North America, and Southern Asia.

References

Rhyparochromidae
Articles created by Qbugbot
Bugs described in 1758
Taxa named by Carl Linnaeus